Zvegor Saddle ( \'zve-gor-ska se-dlo-vi-'na\) is the saddle of elevation 2500 m between Eyer Peak and Mount Press in Probuda Ridge, north-central Sentinel Range in Ellsworth Mountains.  It is surmounting Embree Glacier to the north-northwest and Ellen Glacier to the southeast.

The saddle is named after the settlement of Zvegor in Northeastern Bulgaria.

Location
US mapping in 1961, updated in 1988.

Maps
 Vinson Massif.  Scale 1:250 000 topographic map.  Reston, Virginia: US Geological Survey, 1988.
 Antarctic Digital Database (ADD). Scale 1:250000 topographic map of Antarctica. Scientific Committee on Antarctic Research (SCAR). Since 1993, regularly updated.

References
 Zvegor Saddle. SCAR Composite Antarctic Gazetteer.
 Bulgarian Antarctic Gazetteer. Antarctic Place-names Commission. (details in Bulgarian, basic data in English)

External links
 Zvegor Saddle. Copernix satellite image

Mountain passes of Ellsworth Land
Bulgaria and the Antarctic